Bampini is a village located in the northern part of the municipal unit of Astakos in the western part of Aetolia-Acarnania, Greece. It is located on a hillside, 5 km southeast of Fyteies, 15 km northeast of Astakos, 23 km south of Amfilochia and 23 km west of Agrinio. Agriculture is the most important land use around Bampini.

Historical population

See also
List of settlements in Aetolia-Acarnania

References

External links
https://web.archive.org/web/20050328103757/http://www.akarnania.net/mpampini/greek/odip.htm  (in Greek)

Populated places in Aetolia-Acarnania